The Norwegian Barents Secretariat aims at developing the Norwegian-Russian relations in the north by promoting and funding Norwegian-Russian cooperation projects. As of 2022, the organisation has 11 employees in Kirkenes; its offices are in Arxangelsk, Murmansk, and the Nenets Region, and Kirkenes. 

On behalf of the Norwegian Ministry of Foreign Affairs, the Secretariat grant funds to bilateral Norwegian-Russian cooperation projects. The Secretariat grants approximately 200 Norwegian-Russian projects annually.

The Secretariat is also a center of competence on Norwegian-Russian relations, by carrying through and finance various types of reviews or reports on relevant topics in the region. The Secretariat also coordinate the national goals with the regional political priorities within the frames of the multilateral Barents Cooperation, and work as a resource center for the councils, committees and working groups of the Barents Cooperation.

Head of the Norwegian Barents Secretariat is Lars Georg Fordal (in office since sept 1st, 2016).

The online newspaper The Barents Observer, which covers far northern news issues, with news stories from Russia, Norway, Sweden and Finland, published in English and Russian, was established in 2002 and operated under the aegis of the Barents Secretariat between 2005 and 2015. After a conflict between owners and editors, a new website was established in October 2015, owned by its editors.

See also
Barents Region
Northern Dimension
Sápmi (area)
Circumpolar arctic
Pomors

References

External links
Barents.no The Norwegian Barents Secretariat's official web-site.
BarentsObserver.com News about the Barents Region presented in English and Russian.
Barents Information Service (Finnish, Norwegian, Russian and Swedish cooperative project to build a portal for the Barents region. Funded by the European Union Kolarctic Interreg program.)
barentscooperation.org The Barents Euro-Arctic Council's official web-site.

Norway–Russia relations
Northern Europe
Barents Sea
Novaya Zemlya